A nome (from , nomós, "district") was a territorial division in ancient Egypt. 

Each nome was ruled by a nomarch ( Great Chief). The number of nomes changed through the various periods of the history of ancient Egypt.

Etymology 
The term nome comes from Ancient Greek νομός, nomós, meaning "district"; the Ancient Egyptian term was sepat or spAt. Today's use of the Ancient Greek rather than the Ancient Egyptian term came about during the Ptolemaic period, when the use of Greek was widespread in Egypt. The availability of Greek records on Egypt influenced the adoption of Greek terms by later historians.

History

Dynastic Egypt

The division of ancient Egypt into nomes can be traced back to prehistoric Egypt (before 3100 BC). These nomes originally existed as autonomous city-states, but later began to unify. According to ancient tradition, the ruler Menes completed the final unification.

Not only did the division into nomes remain in place for more than three millennia, the areas of the individual nomes and their ordering remained remarkably stable. Some, like Xois in the Nile Delta or Khent in Upper Egypt, were first mentioned on the Palermo Stone, which was inscribed in the Fifth Dynasty. The names of a few, like the nome of Bubastis, appeared no earlier than the New Kingdom. Under the system that prevailed for most of pharaonic Egypt's history, the country was divided into 42 nomes.

Lower Egypt nomes

Lower Egypt (Egyptian: "Ā-meḥty"), from the Old Kingdom capital Memphis to the Mediterranean Sea, comprised 20 nomes. The first was based around Memphis, Saqqara, and Giza, in the area occupied by modern-day Cairo. The nomes were numbered in a more or less orderly fashion south to north through the Nile Delta, first covering the territory on the west before continuing with the higher numbers to the east. Thus, Alexandria was in the Third Nome; Bubastis was in the Eighteenth.

White Walls Nome 
Travellers land
Cattle land 
Southern shield land 
Northern shield land 
Mountain bull land 
West harpoon land 
East harpoon land 
Andjety god land 
Black bull land 
Heseb bull land
Calf and Cow land 
Prospering Sceptre land 
Eastmost land
Ibis-Tehut land
Fish land
The throne land 
Prince of the South land 
Prince of the North land
Sopdu-Plumed Falcon land

Upper Egypt nomes

Upper Egypt was divided into 22 nomes. The first of these was centered on Elephantine close to Egypt's border with Nubia at the First Cataract – the area of modern-day Aswan. From there the numbering progressed downriver in an orderly fashion along the narrow fertile strip of land that was the Nile valley. Waset (ancient Thebes or contemporary Luxor) was in the Fourth Nome, Amarna in the Fourteenth, and Meidum in the Twenty-first.
Bows land
Throne of Horus land
Shrine land
Sceptre land
The two falcons land
The crocodile land 
Sistrum land
The Great land
Min-God land
Cobra land 
Sha-Set animal land
Viper mountain land
Upper Sycamore and Viper land
Lower Sycamore and Viper land
Hares land 
Oryx Nome 
Anubis land 
Set land 
Two Sceptres land
Southern Sycamore land 
Northern Sycamore land
Knife land

Ptolemaic Egypt

Some nomes were added or renamed during the Graeco-Roman occupation of Egypt. For example, the Ptolemies renamed the Crocodilopolitan nome to Arsinoe. Hadrian created a new nome, Antinoopolites, for which Antinoöpolis was the capital.

Roman Egypt

The nomes survived into Roman times. Under Roman rule, individual nomes minted their own coinage, the so-called "nome coins," which still reflect individual local associations and traditions. The nomes of Egypt retained their primary importance as administrative units until the fundamental rearrangement of the bureaucracy during the reigns of Diocletian and Constantine the Great.

From AD 307/8, their place was taken by smaller units called pagi. Eventually powerful local officials arose who were called pagarchs, through whom all patronage flowed. The pagarch's essential role was as an organizer of tax-collection. Later the pagarch assumed some military functions as well. The pagarchs were often wealthy landowners who reigned over the pagi from which they originated.

Nomarch
For most of the history, each nome was headed by a nomarch. The position of the nomarch was at times hereditary, while at others they were appointed by the pharaoh. Generally, when the national government was stronger, nomarchs were the king's appointed governors. When the central government was weaker, however—such as during foreign invasions or civil wars—individual nomes would assert themselves and establish hereditary lines of succession. Conflicts among these different hereditary nomarchies were common, most notably during the First Intermediate Period, a time that saw a breakdown in central authority lasting from the 7th–11th Dynasties which ended when one of the local rulers became strong enough to again assert control over the entire country as pharaoh.

List of nomes
The nomes are listed in separate tables for "Isti" - "the two Egypts" (Upper and Lower Egypt).

Note: 

 older or other variants of the name in square brackets '[ ]';
 names vary from different time or era, or even titles, most epithets, honorific titles with a slash '/';
Greek-Egypto derived names from the original Egyptian in parentheses '()'

Lower Egypt

Upper Egypt

References

Citations

BIbliography
 .
 .

External links

Details of the nomes

Geography of ancient Egypt
 
Government of the Ptolemaic Kingdom
Roman Egypt